Samisoni is a given name and surname. Notable people with the name include:

Samisoni Fisilau (born 1987), Tongan Rugby Union player
Samisoni Fonomanu Tu'i'afitu (1933–2005), Tongan nobleman 
Samisoni Langi (born 1993), Australian Rugby League player 
Samisoni Tikoinasau, Fijian politician
Samisoni Viriviri (born 1988), Fijian Rugby Union player
Jimione Samisoni (died 2007), Fijian medical doctor, husband of Mere Samisoni
Mere Samisoni, Fijian business person and politician